Brabourne Stadium is a cricket ground in Mumbai, India. It is the home of the Cricket Club of India and has played host to Ranji Trophy matches (including seventeen finals) and Indian Premier League matches, as well as being a Test, One Day International and Twenty20 International (T20) venue. It has a capacity of 20,000 spectators. The ground has hosted eighteen Test matches, the first in 1948 when India played the West Indies. It has also staged nine One Day International matches, the first of which was in 1989 when Australia lost to Pakistan by 66 runs. One T20 International has been played at the ground when India beat Australia by 7 wickets in 2007 (first T20 International to be played in India). Of the nine One Day Internationals played at the stadium, five matches (including the final) were staged during the ICC Champions Trophy in 2006.

The first Test century (100 or more runs in a single innings) scored at the ground was in 1948 by the West Indian Allan Rae in the first innings of the first Test match played at Brabourne Stadium. The first Indian to score a century at the Brabourne was Rusi Modi in the third innings of the same match. In total, 35 Test centuries have been scored at the ground in 18 Test matches. Virender Sehwag's 293, scored against Sri Lanka in 2009, is the highest Test innings achieved  at the ground. The highest Test score by an overseas player is 194 by the West Indian Everton Weekes in 1948. Vijay Hazare has scored the most Test centuries at the ground with four.
 
On 29 October 2018, first century at this ground in the ODIs was scored by Rohit Sharma against West Indies. Sharma also holds the record of highest score at this ground with 162. In total, 2 ODI centuries have been scored at the ground in 9 ODI matches.

No T20 International century have been scored at this ground in one T20I match. Ricky Ponting holds the record for the highest T20 International innings score at the ground, 76 against India in 2007. The highest score by an Indian in a T20 International at the Brabourne is 63 by Gautam Gambhir in the same match.

Key
 * denotes that the batsman was not out.
 Inns. denotes the number of the innings in the match.
 Balls denotes the number of balls faced in an innings.
 NR denotes that the number of balls was not recorded.
 Parentheses next to the player's score denotes his century number at Brabourne Stadium.
 The column title Date refers to the date the match started.

Test centuries

The following table summarises the Test centuries scored at Brabourne Stadium.

One Day International centuries

Women's One Day International centuries

Women's Twenty20 International centuries

References

External links
ESPNcricinfo ground profile

Cricket grounds in Maharashtra
Brabourne
Centuries